The spouse of the governor of Maryland is given an honorary position, styled as First Lady or First Gentleman of the State of Maryland. To date there have been no female governors of the State of Maryland, and all first spouses have been first ladies.

List

See also
List of governors of Maryland

References

External links
 Chronological List of Governors, First Ladies, and Official Hostesses, Maryland State Archives

 
First Spouses of Maryland
First Spouses
Governor of Maryland